Bärbel von Ottenheim, or Barbara von Ottenheim (1430–1484), was the mistress of Lord James von Lichtenberg, the last sovereign of Lichtenberg and bailiff of Strasbourg. She is the model of a famous portrait sculpture.

At the death of James von Lichtenberg in 1480, she became the main beneficiary of his will. The other heirs, Simon IV of Zweibrücken-Bitsch and
Philip II of Hanau-Lichtenberg, accused her of witch craft. She died in prison before the verdict, possibly of murder or suicide.

Notes

Sources 
M. Goltzené: Aus der Geschichte des Amtes Buchsweiler. In: Pay d’Alsace, Heft 111/112, S. 64f.
Fritz Eyer: Das Territorium der Herren von Lichtenberg. Straßburg 1938.
Ernstotto zu Solms-Laubach: Bärbel von Ottenheim. Frankfurt 1936.
Peter Karl Weber: Lichtenberg. Eine elsässische Herrschaft auf dem Weg zum Territorialstaat. Heidelberg 1993.

1430 births
1484 deaths
15th-century German people
Mistresses of German royalty
People accused of witchcraft
Witch trials in Germany